Sergio Giovany Mendoza Escobar (born 23 May 1981) is a Honduran football defender who currently plays for USAC in the Guatemalan national football league.

Club career
Mendoza started his professional career at Real España and joined Olimpia in 2006.

Doping suspension and return
In January 2009 he was suspended for a year by FIFA for using a banned substance. On his return Olimpia claimed him to be theirs because he did not fulfill his contract due to his suspension but he signed for Motagua in October 2009 and he played there for 2 years until his recession on 12 May 2012.

He joined compatriots Gilberto Yearwood and Milton Núñez in summer 2012 at newly promoted Guatemalan side USAC.

International career
Mendoza made his debut for Honduras in a March 2002 friendly match against the USA and has earned a total of 53 caps, scoring 1 goal. He has represented his country in 11 FIFA World Cup qualification matches and played 2 games at the 2010 FIFA World Cup in South Africa. He also played at the 2003, 2005 and 2007 UNCAF Nations Cups as well as at the 2007 CONCACAF Gold Cup.

His final international was an October 2010 friendly match against New Zealand.

International goals

!  !! Date !! Venue !! Opponent !! Score !! Result !! Competition
|-
| align="center" | 1. || May 29, 2008 || Lockhart Stadium, Fort Lauderdale, United States ||  || align="center" | 1-0 || 1-1 || align="center" | 1–1 || Friendly

See also
List of sportspeople sanctioned for doping offences

References

External links

World Cup profile - FIFA

1981 births
Living people
People from Yoro Department
Association football defenders
Honduran footballers
Honduras international footballers
2003 UNCAF Nations Cup players
2005 UNCAF Nations Cup players
2007 UNCAF Nations Cup players
2007 CONCACAF Gold Cup players
2010 FIFA World Cup players
Real C.D. España players
C.D. Olimpia players
F.C. Motagua players
Juticalpa F.C. players
Liga Nacional de Fútbol Profesional de Honduras players
Honduran Liga Nacional de Ascenso players
Honduran expatriate footballers
Expatriate footballers in Guatemala
Doping cases in association football